Mason Ramsey (born November 16, 2006) is an American singer. In March 2018, after gaining Internet fame from a viral video of him yodeling "Lovesick Blues" by Hank Williams at a Walmart, Ramsey was signed to Big Loud. He is known for his single "Famous".

Career

In March 2018, 11-year-old Mason Ramsey, from Golconda, Illinois, was seen on camera singing "Lovesick Blues" in a Walmart store in Harrisburg, Illinois. Within a few days, videos of his performance collectively garnered over 25 million views and he became a viral sensation and internet meme. Ramsey's performance sparked new interest in Hank Williams' 70-year-old recording of the song and in March Rolling Stone reported that Spotify's Viral 50 chart for the U.S. ranked Williams' "Lovesick Blues" at number three, and number four around the globe.

As a result of his newfound fame Ramsey made an appearance on The Ellen DeGeneres Show. Saying that his dream was to appear on the Grand Ole Opry one day, DeGeneres surprised Ramsey by saying he had been booked for the following weekend. On April 13, 2018, American DJ Whethan brought Ramsey out during his set at the 2018 Coachella Valley Music and Arts Festival in Indio, California. In late April, he signed a record deal with Atlantic Records and Nashville-based label Big Loud. His debut single "Famous" entered at number 62 on the US Billboard Hot 100, while the EP debuted in the top 10 of Billboards Heatseekers Albums chart at number 7. Ramsey performed iconic number 1 songs on the Billboard Hot 100 chart's 60th anniversary; starting from the 1960s, he sang hit songs by Mariah Carey, Billy Joel, Paul McCartney, Stevie Wonder, Celine Dion, The Monkees, The Jackson 5, Whitney Houston, Beyoncé, and Adele. On June 8, 2018, he released his cover of "Lovesick Blues". On June 29, 2018, he released "Jambalaya (On the Bayou)" and "The Way I See It". On July 20, 2018, he released his debut extended play (EP), Famous. He was featured on Lil Nas X's third "Old Town Road" remix featuring Billy Ray Cyrus along with Young Thug. 

After a hiatus since 2019, he did a Burger King commercial in which he yodels about cow-based methane emissions in 2020. It is unknown when he will come back to music and as of 2021, he is still on hiatus. Ramsey himself said he now plays basketball under the name Mason Blake, and that he plays on an outside field with friends.

In 2022, Ramsey's song "Before I Knew It" from his 2019 EP Twang gained popularity on TikTok after he used it in several videos updating followers about his life, revealing he now works at Subway.

Filmography

Discography

Extended plays

Singles

As lead artist

As featured artist

Other charted songs

Music videos

References

2006 births
Living people
21st-century American male singers
21st-century American singers
American child singers
American country singers
American Internet celebrities
Atlantic Records artists
Big Loud artists
Country musicians from Illinois
Internet memes
People from Golconda, Illinois
Yodelers
American country songwriters